Heaton, Lancashire may refer to:
Heaton, Lancaster, in Heaton-with-Oxcliffe parish
Heaton, Greater Manchester, near Bolton, Greater Manchester
Four Heatons, near Stockport, Greater Manchester